Old Zionsville is an unincorporated community in Upper Milford Township in Lehigh County, Pennsylvania. It is part of the Lehigh Valley, which has a population of 861,899 and is the 68th most populous metropolitan area in the U.S. as of the 2020 census. 

Old Zionsville has a box post office with ZIP Code 18068. Surrounding areas use the Zionsville ZIP code of 18092 or the Emmaus ZIP code of 18049.

The Upper Milford Township municipal building is located at 5671 Chestnut Street at the former site of Kings Highway Elementary School and has a Saturday farmers' market. There are two churches of the Lutheran and UCC faiths in the village and two more of the Mennonite and Bible Fellowship faiths within a mile to the east near Zionsville. Old Zionsville straddles the divide between the Lehigh and Schuylkill River watersheds. While most of the village is drained via headwaters of Perkiomen Creek to the Schuylkill River, the northern tier including the municipal building is drained via Leibert Creek and Little Lehigh Creek to the Lehigh River. The watershed divide runs east-to-west just north of Ridgeway Drive and Walnut Lane.

Public education
Old Zionsville is served by the East Penn School District. Emmaus High School in Emmaus serves grades nine through 12. Eyer Middle School and Lower Macungie Middle School, both located in Macungie, serve grades six through eight.

References

Unincorporated communities in Lehigh County, Pennsylvania
Unincorporated communities in Pennsylvania